Spain competed at the 2008 Summer Olympics in Beijing, People's Republic of China, with a total of 286 athletes and competed in 25 sports.

Medalists

| width=78% align=left valign=top |

| width=22% align=left valign=top |

Archery

Spain sent one archer to the Olympics. Daniel Morillo earned a spot to compete in the men's competition.

Athletics

The list with the athletes classified for the 2008 Summer Olympics were released in July, after the Campeonato de España de Atletismo 2008 can be found on the following ref.

Men
Track & road events

Field events

Combined events – Decathlon

Women
Track & road events

Field events

Badminton 

Spain sent two badminton players to Beijing; Pablo Abián - men's singles & Yoana Martínez - women's singles.

Basketball

Spain's men's basketball team qualified for the Olympics as the reigning world champion in the 2006 FIBA World Championship. On the other hand, the women's team finished second at the EuroBasket Women 2007, and qualified for the final five Olympic spots at the FIBA World Olympic Qualifying Tournament for Women 2008.

2008 Summer Olympics Spanish basketball team 'slanty-eye' photo incident
Both men and women 2008 Summer Olympics Spanish basketball teams were a part of the 'slanty-eye' gesture photo incident that took place before the Beijing Olympics. The photo was a feature ad as a newspaper spread in Spain, showing all players using their fingers to apparently make their eyes look more Chinese (Epicanthic fold) on a basketball court adorned with a Chinese dragon. The photo was part of a publicity campaign for team sponsor Seur and was used only in Spain.

"It was something like supposed to be funny or something but never offensive in any way", said forward Pau Gasol. "I'm sorry if anybody thought or took it the wrong way and thought that it was offensive."

Guard José Calderón said the team was responding to a request from the photographer. "We felt it was something appropriate, and that it would be interpreted as an affectionate gesture", said Calderón. "Without a doubt, some ... press didn't see it that way."

Men's tournament

Roster

Group play

Quarterfinals

Semifinals

Gold medal match

Women's tournament

Roster

Group play

Quarterfinals

Boxing

Spain qualified one boxer for the Olympic boxing tournament. Kelvin de la Nieve earned a qualifying spot at the second European qualifying tournament.

Canoeing

Slalom
Spain sent three people, two men and one woman, to compete in the slalom events at the 2008 Summer Olympics.

Sprint
Men

Women

Qualification Legend: QS = Qualify to semi-final; QF = Qualify directly to final

Cycling

Road
Men

Women

Track
Pursuit

Omnium

Mountain biking

Diving

Spain will send one man and one woman to compete at the 2008 Summer Olympics.

Men

Women

Equestrian

Spain sent two men and one woman to compete in equestrian events at the 2008 Summer Olympics, however Beatriz Ferrer-Salat, and therefore dressage team, were unable to compete because Beatriz's horse, Fabergé, suffered an injury shortly before the start of the games.

Dressage

Fencing

Men

Women

Field hockey

Men's tournament

Roster

Group play

Semifinals

Gold medal match

Women's tournament

Roster

Group play

7th–8th place

Gymnastics

Artistic
Men
Team

Individual finals

Women

Rhythmic

Handball

Men's tournament

Roster

Group play

Quarterfinal

Semifinal

Bronze medal game

Final rank

Judo

Men

Women

Modern pentathlon

Spain will send one man to compete at the modern pentathlon: Jaime López

Rowing

Spain send one rower to the 2008 Summer Olympics – Nuria Domínguez. She competed in the women's singles event. This was her third Olympic appearance as she rowed in the 1996 Summer Olympics and the 2004 Summer Olympics.

Women

Qualification Legend: FA=Final A (medal); FB=Final B (non-medal); FC=Final C (non-medal); FD=Final D (non-medal); FE=Final E (non-medal); FF=Final F (non-medal); SA/B=Semifinals A/B; SC/D=Semifinals C/D; SE/F=Semifinals E/F; QF=Quarterfinals; R=Repechage

Sailing

Spain qualified in 10 Olympic sailing classes and will be sending 16 athletes to the races in Qingdao, China.

Men

Women

Open

M = Medal race; EL = Eliminated – did not advance into the medal race; CAN = Race cancelled;

Shooting

Men

Women

Swimming

Men

Women

Synchronized swimming

Table tennis

Singles

Team

Taekwondo

Tennis

Men

Women

Triathlon

Volleyball

Beach

Water polo 

Only the men's team qualified to play on these Olympic Games. The team finished in fifth place.

Men's tournament

Roster

Group play

All times are China Standard Time (UTC+8).

Quarterfinal

Classification round (5th–6th place)

Weightlifting

Wrestling 

Men's freestyle

Women's freestyle

See also
 Spain at the 2008 Summer Paralympics

References

Nations at the 2008 Summer Olympics
2008
Olympics